The Sharmin and Bijan Mossavar-Rahmani Center for Iran and Persian Gulf Studies is a study center department at Princeton University. Its aim is to support teaching and research of Iran and Persian Gulf studies and to create and support productive and innovative connections across departments throughout the university.

See also 
 Iranian studies
 History of Iran
 Persian Gulf Studies Center
 Persian Gulf Online Organization
 Persian Gulf naming dispute

External links 
Sharmin and Bijan Mossavar-Rahmani Center for Iran and Persian Gulf Studies
Iranian Americans Establish Center for Iran and Persian Gulf Studies at Princeton University
Iranian.com

References 

Princeton University
Iranian studies
Middle Eastern studies in the United States